The 2020–21 FA Women's League Cup was the tenth edition of the FA Women's Super League and FA Women's Championship's league cup competition. It was sponsored by Continental AG, who sponsored the competition since its creation, and is officially known as the FA Women's Continental League Cup for sponsorship reasons. All 23 teams from the FA Women's Super League and FA Women's Championship contested the competition. Chelsea were the defending champions and successfully defended the title by beating Bristol City in the final.

Format changes
As a result of the COVID-19 pandemic, the start of the 2020–21 season was delayed, forcing many leagues and competitions to shorten their format. To reduce the total number of games, the previous format of four groups of six (with one being reduced in size by one to suit the total of 23 teams) was altered to six groups of four (with one short again), reducing the number of group stage games from five each to three each. With six group winners now, only the two best second place teams qualified for the knock-out round.

Group stage

Group A

Group B

Group C

Group D

Group E

Group F

Ranking of second-placed teams
Due to Group E containing one fewer team, the ranking to determine which two second-placed teams progress is calculated on a points-per-game basis.

Knock-out stage

Quarter-finals
The draw for this round was made live on BT Sport Score on 19 December 2020. The two teams that qualified as best placed runners-up could not be drawn against the teams that topped their respective groups meaning Bristol City were not eligible to face Crystal Palace and Durham could not be drawn with Aston Villa. Manchester City's match against Chelsea was postponed following a COVID-19 outbreak in the Manchester City first-team squad.

Semi-finals

Final

On 28 January, it was announced the 2021 FA Women's League Cup Final would be held at Vicarage Road, the home of Watford FC, for the first time. The game was televised live domestically on BT Sport 2 and internationally via the FA's own streaming service the FA Player.

See also
2020–21 FA WSL
2020–21 FA Women's Championship

References

External links
Official website

FA Women's League Cup
Cup
Fa women's League Cup, 2020-21